Matra BAe Dynamics was formed in August 1996 by merger of half the missile business of Matra Defense of France and BAe Dynamics (a division of British Aerospace) of the UK and was Europe's largest manufacturer of missiles and UAVs.

British Aerospace had previously sought to merge its missile business with Thomson-CSF, the companies announced their plan to create a new combined company called Eurodynamics in 1989. However, after more than a year of monopoly investigations the deal collapsed.

The formation of Matra BAe Dynamics was followed in 1997 by the acquisition of a 30% share of LFK, an Airbus subsidiary. In 2002 Matra BAe Dynamics joined Aerospatiale Matra Missiles (the other half of Matra's missile business) and Alenia Marconi Systems (missile division only) to form MBDA.

References

Aerospace companies of the United Kingdom
BAE Systems subsidiaries and divisions
Defence companies of France
Defence companies of the United Kingdom
France–United Kingdom military relations
Guided missile manufacturers
Manufacturing companies established in 1996
Matra
Multinational joint-venture companies
1996 establishments in France
British companies established in 1996